Lisa Sowle Cahill is an American ethicist, and J. Donald Monan Professor at Boston College. 
She first became known in the 1980s with her studies on gender and sexual ethics, but now she has extended her work to social and global ethics. 
Lisa Sowle Cahill's work focuses on an attempt to discuss the complexity of moral issues while lowering tensions about theological disagreements between the Church and society.

Education 
In 1970, Cahill received a B.A. in theology from Santa Clara University. She then went on to receive her M.A. and Ph.D. from the University of Chicago Divinity School. She completed her dissertation in 1976 under the guidance of James Gustafson. James Gustafson introduced her to Richard McCormick SJ and Father Charles Curran, both of whom have influenced her own career in moral theology. She has taught at Boston College since 1976 and has been a visiting scholar at the Kennedy Institute of Ethics, Georgetown University, and a visiting professor of Catholic theology at Yale University.

Career 
Sometimes called a feminist theologian and sometimes a bioethicist, Cahill has published over two hundred articles and has worked on as many as fifteen books.   She is a member of the American Academy of Arts and Sciences and in 2008 she was awarded the John Courtney Murray Award by the Catholic Theological Society of America.

Works 
 Global Justice, Christology and Christian Ethics, Cambridge University Press, 2013
 Bioethics and the Common Good, Marquette University Press, 2005
 Genetics, Theology, Ethics:  An Interdisciplinary Conversation, Crossroad Publishing Company, 2005

  
 Family: a Christian social perspective,  Fortress Press, 2000,  
  

'Just Love,' Reviewed. https://www.americamagazine.org/issue/100/just-love-reviewed October 7, 2012, America Magazine

References 

Living people
Boston College people
21st-century American Roman Catholic theologians
Women Christian theologians
Year of birth missing (living people)
Presidents of the Catholic Theological Society of America
20th-century American Roman Catholic theologians
Catholic feminists